Aporocactus martianus (syn. Disocactus martianus) is a species of cactus found in Oaxaca, Mexico.

Description
Disocactus martianus grows creeping, occasionally forming lithophytic with aerial roots. It is a species of fleshy, cylindrical suspended or creeping cactus with stems up to 1.5 meters long and up to 2.5 centimeters thick, sometimes with aerial roots, with 8 to 10 slightly wart-shaped ribs; 3 or 4 central pale brown spines up to 12 mm long and 6 to 20 radial spines are light yellowish and only 5 to 7 millimeters long. The bright red flowers are diurnal and produced in summer, 10 to 12 centimeters in diameter and a length of 5 to 7 centimeters. The flowers stay open for a couple of days. They are followed by globose fruits of green color and 2 cm in diameter. It is viviparous.

Taxonomy & Systematics

It was first described as Cereus martianus in 1837 by Ludwig Georg Karl Pfeiffer. Wilhelm Barthlott moved the species to Disocactus in 1991
The following species and varieties are synonyms: 
Cereus martianus , 
Eriocereus martianus , 
Aporocactus martianus , 
Aporocactus conzattii , 
Cereus conzattii 
Aporocactus martianus var. Conzattii .

In their synopsis of the tribe Hylocereeae from 2017, Nadja Korotkova, Thomas Borsch and Salvador Arias interpret the species as a synonym of Aporocactus martianus.

References

External links

Hylocereeae
Cacti of Mexico
Flora of Oaxaca
Epiphytes